Angela Schmidt-Foster (born 6 January 1960) is a Canadian former cross-country skier who competed in the 1980 Winter Olympics, in the 1984 Winter Olympics, in the 1988 Winter Olympics, and in the 1992 Winter Olympics.

Cross-country skiing results
All results are sourced from the International Ski Federation (FIS).

Olympic Games

World Championships

World Cup

Season standings

Individual podiums
1 podium

References

1960 births
Living people
Canadian female cross-country skiers
Olympic cross-country skiers of Canada
Cross-country skiers at the 1980 Winter Olympics
Cross-country skiers at the 1984 Winter Olympics
Cross-country skiers at the 1988 Winter Olympics
Cross-country skiers at the 1992 Winter Olympics
20th-century Canadian women